The Qingdao–Yinchuan corridor is a China Railway High-speed line running from Qingdao, Shandong to Yinchuan, Ningxia. The line passes through the cities of Jinan, Shijiazhuang, and Taiyuan. Announced in 2016 as part of the national "eight vertical and eight horizontal" high-speed railway network, the line comprises the existing Qingdao–Taiyuan passenger railway and the Taiyuan–Zhongwei–Yinchuan railway.

Overview 
The Qingdao–Yinchuan corridor runs east–west ("horizontally") from the coastal city of Qingdao in Shandong Province, passing through Jinan, Shijiazhuang, and Taiyuan before terminating at Yinchuan in Ningxia.

Sections 

Operational lines are marked with green background. The Taiyuan-Yinchuan section is not high-speed and does not yet have any through trains beyond Taiyuan South and is marked as blue.

References

See also 
 High-speed rail in China

High-speed rail in China